Chin United Football Club is a Burmese football club. The club is based in Chin State and is one of the two teams representing the state along with GFA FC.

The club is composed mostly of Chin players, who claimed to have faced ethnic prejudice and discrimination on the pitch.

Honours
Myanmar National League 2
Champions (2): 2013, 2019

Crest and colors

According to the club, the eagle was chosen for the crest as it is the putative 'king of all the birds'. The nine stars are supposed to represent the nine townships in Chin State.

Recent seasons
Their first season in the 2012 Myanmar National League resulted in one victory out of 26 games. After getting relegated, they returned to the top tier in 2014 were they finished tenth out of 12 teams.

2020 Final Squad list

References

External links
official website
Myanmar Football Federation

Football clubs in Myanmar
Association football clubs established in 2015
Myanmar National League clubs